Fargo–Moorhead, also known as the FM area, is a common name given to the metropolitan area comprising Fargo, North Dakota; Moorhead, Minnesota; and the surrounding communities. These two cities lie on the North Dakota–Minnesota border, on opposite banks of the Red River of the North. The region is the cultural, retail, health care, educational, and industrial center of southeastern North Dakota and northwestern Minnesota.

The Fargo–Moorhead area is defined by the Census Bureau as comprising all of Cass County, North Dakota and Clay County, Minnesota, which includes the cities of Dilworth, MN, West Fargo, ND, and numerous other towns and developments from which commuters travel daily for work, education, and regular activities. A July 1, 2015 census estimate placed the population at 233,836, an increase of 34% from the 2000 census.

Communities

Core cities 
Fargo, North Dakota 
Moorhead, Minnesota
West Fargo, North Dakota
Dilworth, Minnesota

Suburbs/Adjacent towns 
Briarwood, North Dakota
Frontier, North Dakota
Harwood, North Dakota
Horace, North Dakota
Mapleton, North Dakota
North River, North Dakota
Prairie Rose, North Dakota
Reile's Acres, North Dakota
Sabin, Minnesota

Bedroom communities 
Barnesville, Minnesota
Casselton, North Dakota
Davenport, North Dakota
Glyndon, Minnesota
Hawley, Minnesota
Hickson, North Dakota
Kindred, North Dakota
Leonard, North Dakota
Oxbow, North Dakota
Walcott, North Dakota

Demographics

Age
According to the American Community Survey, the age distribution was as follows:

 Under 5 years: 6.8%
 5–9 years: 6.1%
 10–14 years: 5.9%
 15–19 years: 8.0%
 20–24 years: 11.9%
 25–34 years: 16.0%
 35–44 years: 12.8%
 45–54 years: 13.2%
 55–59 years: 5.1%
 60–64 years: 3.7%
 65–74 years: 4.9%
 75–84 years: 3.7%
 85 years and over: 1.8%
 Median age: 31.6 years

Race
According to the same survey, the racial composition was as follows:

 White: 93.3% (Non-Hispanic Whites: 92.0%)
 Black or African American: 1.6%
 American Indian: 1.4%
 Asian: 1.4%
 Native Hawaiian and Other Pacific Islander: 0.1%
 Some other race: 0.8%
 Two or more races: 1.4%
 Hispanic or Latino (of any race): 2.5%

There were 3,032 African Americans, who made up 1.6% of the population.

The Asian American population is not dominated by a single ancestry group, and is fairly diverse. The largest Asian American group are those of Chinese descent, who number at 928 and make up 0.5% of the population. Other sizable groups include Indians, Vietnamese, and Koreans, who number at 393, 379, and 360 respectively; all three groups comprise roughly 0.2% of the population. There are 134 Filipinos, making up roughly 0.1% of the population. People of Japanese descent were very few, with only 40 people identifying themselves as Japanese; they make up a mere 0.02% of the population.

Pacific Islander Americans numbered at 119, and made up approximately 0.06% of the population.

Multiracial Americans make up 1.4% of the metro area's population. Those of white and Native American ancestry made up 0.5% of the population, and numbered at 938. People of white and Asian ancestry numbered at 557, and those of white and black ancestry numbered at 571. Both groupings made up roughly 0.3% of the population. Approximately 72 people identified themselves as black and Native American.

Hispanics and Latinos are the largest minority group in Fargo–Moorhead. Hispanics and Latinos make up 2.5% of the population, of which 2.0% are of Mexican descent. Of the 4,786 Hispanics, 3,846 are Mexican. There were 196 Puerto Ricans and 136 Cubans; both of these groups made up roughly 0.1% of the population. In addition, 608 individuals identified themselves with other Hispanic or Latino groups other than Mexican, Puerto Rican, and Cuban, making up 0.3% of the population.

The Native American population is predominantly Ojibwe, with a Sioux minority. Of the 2,679 Native Americans, 1,447 are of the Chippewa tribal grouping. The Chippewa alone make up 0.8% of the population. The 444 Sioux make up 0.2% of the population. In addition, 20 people identified themselves as a member of the Cherokee tribal grouping.

NOTE: The source above contains all of the information on population, age, and race.

Ancestry
The European American population is overwhelmingly German and Scandinavian. Most of the Scandinavian population is of Norwegian descent. Smaller Euro-American groups include those of English, Irish, and French descent.

As of the 2006–2008 American Community Survey, the top ten largest European ancestry groups were the following:

 German: 42.9% (82,398)
 Norwegian: 36.4% (69,964)
 Irish: 8.6% (16,589)
 Swedish: 6.6% (12,641)
 English: 4.8% (9,286)
 French: 4.3% (8,283)
 Polish: 3.2% (6,180)
 Russian: 2.0% (3,783) 
 Czech: 1.6% (3,047)
 Scottish: 1.5% (2,871)

Language spoken at home
 Population 5 years and over: 179,175
 English only: 93.6% (167,729)
 Language other than English: 6.4% (11,446)
 Spanish: 2.1% (3,771)
 Other Indo-European languages: 2.5% (4,393)
 Asian and Pacific Islander languages: 0.9% (1,659)
 Other languages: 0.9% (1,623)

NOTE: The source above contains all of the information on ancestry and language.

Politics

The Fargo–Moorhead area has generally leaned Republican, voting for that party's presidential candidate in every election between 1968 and 2004. While Clay County is a swing county which has voted for Democrats 9 times and Republicans 7 times since 1960, Cass County has only voted Democratic twice: for Lyndon B. Johnson in 1964 and Barack Obama in 2008. 

In recent years, however, Fargo–Moorhead has become very competitive. In 2008, it voted for Obama by a nearly-10-point margin, followed by just 0.2% in 2012. In 2016, it flipped Republican once again, voting for Donald Trump by 8 points, and it voted for Trump again in 2020, albeit by a narrow margin of less than a percentage point.

Culture

Fargo/Wahpeton CSA
The Census Bureau also tracks a Fargo–Wahpeton Combined Statistical Area, consisting of Cass and Clay counties, as well as the Wahpeton micropolitan area of Richland County, North Dakota and Wilkin County, Minnesota. This area includes the twin cities of Wahpeton, North Dakota and Breckenridge, Minnesota. 

The Fargo–Moorhead urban core is actually about forty-five minutes of highway travel from the Wahpeton–Breckenridge core. The main connection between these two pairs of cities is the Red River Valley, the flat, fertile land that both depend upon for a major part of their economies. Potatoes and sugar beets are important crops in the region, in addition to most of the other crops produced elsewhere in Minnesota and North Dakota.

See also
 Fargo-Moorhead media
 North Dakota statistical areas

References